The Duke–NUS Medical School (Duke–NUS) is a graduate medical school in Singapore. The school was set up in April 2005 as the Duke–NUS Graduate Medical School, Singapore's second medical school, after the Yong Loo Lin School of Medicine, and before the Lee Kong Chian School of Medicine. It is a collaboration between Duke University in the United States and the National University of Singapore in Singapore. Duke–NUS follows the American model of post-baccalaureate medical education, in which students begin their medical studies after earning a bachelor’s degree. Students are awarded degrees from both Duke University School of Medicine and the National University of Singapore.

Outram campus 
The construction of Duke-NUS Medical School's primary facility, the Khoo Teck Puat Building, started in December 2006. In May 2009, Duke-NUS moved into the building at the Outram campus of Singapore General Hospital, next to the College of Medicine Building. The building was officially inaugurated by the Prime Minister of Singapore Lee Hsien Loong on 28 September 2009. The 13-storey building is green-certified and was the tallest building at the Outram campus until the recent completion of another academic building.

Graduate programs

Doctor of Medicine program
Duke-NUS' Doctor of Medicine (MD) program is a four-year program that follows the Duke University School of Medicine curriculum. Students who successfully complete the course of study and fulfill all requirements are awarded a joint MD degree from Duke University and the National University of Singapore.

The Duke-NUS curriculum is similar to that of Duke University, consisting of four years: the first year is for pre-clerkship, second year for clerkship, third year for research, and fourth year for advanced clinical rotations. Duke-NUS employs an extensive team-based learning method called TeamLEAD (Learn, Engage, Apply, Develop). Students prepare for classes with pre-reading materials and recorded lectures. They begin the class with a test, and then proceed to discuss test questions and other open-ended questions in a small group setting. The faculty act as facilitators for student discussions, moving away from traditional pedagogical teaching.

Duke-NUS accepted its first batch of MD students in 2007. The first class of MD students graduated in 2011. Since then, over 200 students have graduated with a Doctor of Medicine degree.

Each year, about 60 to 70 students are enrolled in each cohort. Two-thirds of the students are Singaporeans or permanent residents of Singapore.  The rest of the students come from over 20 countries, including Canada, China, India, Malaysia, South Korea and the U.S. On average, the incoming medical students are 26 years old.

Prospective students are required to take the Medical College Admission Test (MCAT). For the entering class of 2021, the average GPA was 3.68 and the average MCAT score was 516 (92nd percentile). Besides MCAT, the Admission Committee also evaluates applicants based on their academic performance, research experience, and evidence of leadership capabilities. Data has shown that Duke-NUS students score significantly higher than the US national average on the USMLE.

PhD program
Duke-NUS offers a Doctor of Philosophy (PhD) programme in Integrated Biology and Medicine. Students complete the following in the PhD programme: 4 months of laboratory rotations, and 4 – 5 years of research work in Singapore. The class size is about 15 students currently. Upon completion of the course, candidates are awarded a PhD from both the National University of Singapore and Duke University.

MD-PhD program
Duke-NUS also offers an MD-PhD programme, where students complete the following: 1 year of basic science coursework, 1 year of clinical rotations, 4 years of research work in Singapore or the United States, and 1 final year of clinical rotations. Upon completion of the course, candidates are awarded a joint MD degree from Duke University and the National University of Singapore, along with a PhD degree from the National University of Singapore or Duke University.

Notable faculty

Eric Finkelstein 
Colin Blakemore
Tien Wong 
Lim Kah Leong 
Augustus John Rush 
Su-Chun Zhang 
Yvonne Chuan Fang Su 
Janil Puthucheary 
Koh Poh Koon 
R. Sanders Williams 
Dale Purves 
George J. Augustine

References

External links
 

Duke University
National University of Singapore
Medical schools in Singapore